Ryen is a neighborhood in the borough Nordstrand.

The area is served by the station Ryen of the Oslo T-bane. The eastern depot of the rapid transit system is located at Ryen. Until 1967, it was also served by Simensbråten of the Oslo Tramway. It has also increased in population over the years.

Neighbourhoods of Oslo